Sir William Turner Thiselton-Dyer  (28 July 1843 – 23 December 1928) was a leading British botanist, and the third director of the Royal Botanic Gardens, Kew.

Life and career 
Thiselton-Dyer was born in Westminster, London. He was a son of William George Thiselton-Dyer (1812-1868), physician and Catherine Jane, née Firminger (1815-1897), botanist. He was educated at King's College School where he was first mathematical scholar, and later proceeded to the medical department of King's College London, where he remained until 1863 when he proceeded to Christ Church, Oxford. Initially studying mathematics at Christ Church, Oxford, he graduated in natural science in 1867. He became Professor of Natural History at the Royal Agricultural College in Cirencester and then Professor of Botany at the Royal College of Science for Ireland in Dublin. In 1872, he became professor at the Royal Horticultural Society in London, being recommended by Joseph Dalton Hooker.

Then in 1875, Thiselton-Dyer was appointed Assistant Director at the Royal Botanic Gardens, Kew, under Hooker, where he was to stay for thirty years. Thiselton-Dyer spent considerable time working for the benefit of the British colonies. He introduced rubber plantations to Sri Lanka and Malaya, and introduced cacao from Trinidad to plantations in Sri Lanka. In 1877, he was given charge of an international research laboratory, established at Kew with private funding, which became known as one of the best laboratories in Europe. Thiselton-Dyer also designed a new rock garden, after a bequest to Kew in 1881 of a large collection of Alpine plants.

Thiselton-Dyer was elected FRS in 1880. His proposers included Charles Darwin and George Bentham, but not Joseph Dalton Hooker, whose daughter Dyer had already married. From 1885 to 1905, after the retirement of Hooker, he was director of the Royal Botanic Gardens.

As Director, in 1896 Dyer appointed the first women gardeners at Kew, Annie Gulvin and Alice Hutchins.

Thiselton-Dyer was a fellow of the University of London from 1887 to 1890, Royal Commissioner to the Paris International Exhibition (1900) and to the St. Louis Exposition (1904), botanical adviser to the Secretary of State for the Colonies (1902–1906), and became a member of the court of the University of Bristol in 1909.  His principal works are an English edition of Sachs Text-Book of Botany (1875), editions of the Flora Capensis and of the Flora of Tropical Africa, and Index Kewensis (1905). 
With his former school-friend Henry Trimen he published The Flora of Middlesex (1869).

He married the botanical illustrator Harriet Anne Hooker, daughter of Joseph Dalton Hooker, in 1877; they had one son and one daughter. Harriet Anne Dyer (née Hooker) lived at Kew from birth until old age, surviving her husband and dying in 1946 aged 91, in her house near Bere Alston. Thiselton-Dyer was appointed  in 1899, and awarded the Clarke Medal by the Royal Society of New South Wales in 1892. He died at The Ferns (now Crickley Court), Witcombe, a village near Gloucester, and is buried in the churchyard of St Peter's, Bentham.

References

William Turner Thiselton-Dyer (1843–1928) at Royal Botanic gardens, Kew

External links

Correspondence to William Thiselton-Dyer as Director of The Royal Botanic Gardens, Kew is being made available online through the Directors' Correspondence Project.

English botanists
English horticulturists
1843 births
1928 deaths
Botanists active in Kew Gardens
Fellows of the Linnean Society of London
Fellows of the Royal Society
Academics of the Royal Agricultural University
Alumni of Christ Church, Oxford
Alumni of King's College London
Fellows of King's College London
People educated at King's College School, London
Knights Commander of the Order of St Michael and St George
Companions of the Order of the Indian Empire
People from Westminster
19th-century British botanists
20th-century British botanists